Bactra suedana is a moth, belonging to the family Tortricidae. The species was first described by Bengt Å. Bengtsson in 1989.

It is native to Northern Europe.

References

Bactrini